Manoharam may refer to:

 Manoharam (2000 film), a Telugu film
 Manoharam (2019 film), a Malayalam film

See also
 Manohara (film), a 1954 Tamil language film